Anna Zaja (born 25 June 1991) is a German tennis player.

Zaja has won six singles and 13 doubles titles on the ITF Women's Circuit. In May 2019, she reached her best singles ranking of world No. 184. On 28 April 2014, she peaked at No. 145 in the WTA doubles rankings.

ITF Circuit finals

Singles: 12 (6 titles, 6 runner–ups)

Doubles: 27 (13 titles, 14 runner–ups)

References

External links
 
 

1991 births
Living people
People from Sigmaringen
Sportspeople from Tübingen (region)
German female tennis players
Tennis people from Baden-Württemberg